Assiscunk Creek is a tributary of the Delaware River in southwestern New Jersey in the United States.

The name Assiscunk (also spelled Assiscunke or Essiscunk) came from the Lenape language meaning "muddy creek". Other names were Wissahisk River, Birch Creek, and Barracks Creek.

It originates in Springfield Township, and soon forms the border between Springfield Township and Mansfield Township. It is fed by Annaricken Brook, and then by Crafts Creek just at the U.S. Route 206 crossing. Assiscunk Branch and Barkers Brook enter between U.S. Route 206 and the New Jersey Turnpike crossing. The creek begins to widen on the outskirts of Burlington City, where it empties into the Delaware River. Wetlands along the creek are habitats for many species, among them the bog turtle, which is considered a threatened and endangered species.

The creek is designated as suboptimal under Habitat Analysis, and has moderately impaired waters, a major improvement from recent decades when the river was designated as severely impaired or having marginal habitat conditions.

Pollution is a problem for the Assiscunk Creek, and much of this comes from non-point sources. The land around the creek is mostly agricultural, but there are areas of urban surfaces and forest as well. Assiscunk Creek is still an impaired river, but has improved greatly in recent years thanks to hard efforts to stop the pollution.

Tributaries
Barkers Brook
Assiscunk Branch
Crafts Creek
Annaricken Brook

See also
List of rivers of New Jersey

References

External links
Mansfield History

Tributaries of the Delaware River
Rivers of New Jersey
Rivers of Burlington County, New Jersey